Mary Anne Bryant Mayo (1845-1903) was an American farm organizer for the Patrons of Husbandry (called the Grange). She is known for her work as part of the American Granger movement to better farm communities.

Early life and career 
Mary Anne Bryant Mayo was born in May 24, 1845 in Convis Township, Michigan in Battle Creek, Michigan. She married Perry Mayo in 1865, who shared her passion for organizations that work to better the community and the individual. Both were elected to positions in the county organization in the early 1870s after becoming involved in the Patrons of Husbandry (also known as the Grange) and the creation of Farmers' Institutes. Mary Mayo in particular developed into a very active and successful Grange organizer where she held positions as the head of the woman's labor committee, and the state Grange chaplain starting in 1891.

In her position, she founded the "Fresh Air" program, which involved bringing urban impoverished children to stay in Granger houses for weekends in the country. Overtime, she organized of gathering of women here she deliver lectures on courses inline with the Farmers’ Institute framework. After over 10 years of struggle, she secured the establishment of a women’s department (1897) in its own building (1900) at Michigan State Agricultural College (now Michigan State University).

References 

1845 births
1903 deaths
19th-century American women
People from Battle Creek, Michigan